Hazelnuts (Corylus species) are used as food plants by the caterpillars of several Lepidoptera species including:

Monophagous
Species which feed exclusively on Corylus:

 Bucculatricidae
 Bucculatrix callistricha
 Bucculatrix fugitans
 Coleophoridae
 Coleophora corylifoliella

Polyphagous
Species which feed on Corylus among other plants:

 Bucculatricidae
 Bucculatrix demaryella
 Coleophoridae
 Coleophora case-bearers:
C. anatipennella – recorded on common hazel (C. avellana)
C. badiipennella
C. binderella
C. fuscocuprella
C. paripennella
C. serratella
 Drepanidae
 Habrosyne pyritoides (buff arches)
 Geometridae
 Agriopis marginaria (dotted border)
 Campaea margaritata (light emerald)
 Crocallis elinguaria (scalloped oak) – recorded on common hazel (C. avellana)
 Erannis defoliaria (mottled umber)
 Epirrita autumnata (autumnal moth)
 Epirrita christyi (pale November moth)
 Epirrita dilutata (November moth)
 Geometra papilionaria (large emerald)
 Hemithea aestivaria (common emerald)
 Lomaspilis marginata (clouded border)
 Operophtera brumata (winter moth)
 Noctuidae
 Acronicta leporina (miller) – recorded on common hazel (C. avellana)
 Acronicta psi (grey dagger)
 Cosmia trapezina (dun-bar)
 Eupsilia transversa (satellite) – recorded on common hazel (C. avellana)
 Orthosia gothica (Hebrew character) – recorded on common hazel (C. avellana)
 Notodontidae
 Nadata gibbosa (rough prominent)
 Phalera bucephala (buff-tip)
 Oecophoridae
 Alabonia geoffrella – recorded in dead twigs of common hazel (C. avellana)
 Esperia oliviella – recorded in dead twigs of hazels
 Saturniidae
 Automeris io (Io moth) – recorded on common hazel (C. avellana)
 Sphingidae
 Amorpha juglandis (walnut sphinx)

External links

Hazelnuts
+Lepidoptera